Adamston may refer to:
Adamston, West Virginia, a former town in Harrison County 
Adamston, New Jersey, an unincorporated community within Brick Township
Victory High School (currently known as Adamston High School), located in Clarksburg, West Virginia

See also 
 Adamstown (disambiguation)